Gorgan (also romanized as Gorgān, Gurgān, and Gurgan), formerly Esterabad  (also romanized as Astarābād, Asterabad, and Esterābād), is the capital city of Golestan Province, Iran. In the 2006 census; its population was 269,226, in 73,702 families.

History

There are several archaeological sites near Gorgan, including Tureng Tepe and Shah Tepe, in which there are remains dating from the Neolithic and Chalcolithic eras. Some other important Neolithic sites in the area are Yarim Tepe, and Sange Chaxmaq. The nearby Shahroud Plain has many such sites. More than 50 are on the Gorgan Plain.

According to the Greek historian Arrian, Zadracarta was the largest city of Hyrcania and site of the "royal palace". The term means "the yellow city", and it was given to it from the great number of oranges, lemons, and other fruit trees which grew in the outskirts of that city.

Hyrcania became part of the Achaemenid Empire during the reign of Cyrus the Great (559–530 BC), its founder, or his successor Cambyses (530-522 BC).

The Great Wall of Gorgan, the second biggest defensive wall in the world, was built in the Parthian and Sassanian periods.

At the time of the Sassanids, "Gurgan" appeared as the name of a city, province capital, and province.

Gorgan maintained its independence as a Zoroastrian state even after Persia was conquered by the Muslim Arabs in the 8th century.

In 1210, the city was invaded and sacked by the army of Kingdom of Georgia under command of the brothers Mkhargrdzeli.

"Old Gorgan" was destroyed during the Mongol invasion in the 13th century, and the center of the region was moved to what was called "Astarabad", which is currently called "Gorgan".

Gorgan with its surrounding regions was sometimes considered as part of  the Tabaristan region.

Astarabad was an important political and religious city during the Qajar era.

Geography

Climate
Gorgan has a humid subtropical climate (Köppen: Cfa, Trewartha: Cf), with hot, humid summers and cool, wet winters. In general, Golestan has a moderate and humid climate known as "the moderate Caspian climate". The effective factors behind such a climate are: Alborz mountain range, direction of the mountains, height of the area, neighborhood to the sea, vegetation surface, local winds, altitude and weather fronts. As a result of the above factors, three different climates exist in the region: plain moderate, mountainous, and semi-arid. Gorgan valley has a semi-arid climate.

Notable people

Ancient 

 Fakhroddin Asaad Gorgani, 11th-century Persian poet and the composer of Vis and Ramin.
 Abu Sa'id al-Darir al-Jurjani, 9th century astronomer and mathematician
 Al-Masihi, 10th century physician and teacher of Avicenna
 Abd al-Qāhir al-Jurjānī, 11th century grammarian and literary theorist
 Zayn al-Din al-Jurjani, 12th century royal physician
 Bahram al-Da'i, 12th-century Nizari Ismaili missionary and military leader in Syria
 Fazlallah Astarabadi (Naimi), 14th century mystic and founder of Hurufism
 Rustam Gorgani, 16th century physician
 Mir Fendereski,  philosopher, poet and mysti
 Mir Damad, 17th century Islamic scholar and Neoplatonic philosopher
 Mirza Mehdi Khan Astarabadi, 18th century chief minister to Nader Shah
 Bibi Khatoon Astarabadi, writer, satirist and feminist
 Firishta, historian
 Sardar Rafie Yanehsari, Governor of Astarabad

Modern 

Iraj Etesam, Iranian architect, educator and author; born in Gorgan.
Nader Ebrahimi, author, poet, director and researcher
Hossein Khanzadi, admiral in the Iranian Navy
Mohammad Reza Lotfi, traditional Persian musician
Maryam Zandi, photographer

Education

Golestan University
Golestan University of Medical Sciences
Gorgan University
Islamic Azad University of Gorgan

Sports
Shahrdari Gorgan competes in the Iranian Basketball Super League and Etka Gorgan F.C. competes in the Azadegan League.

Sister cities
   Aktau,  Kazakhstan
 Samsun, Turkey (2006)

See also
Gorgan International Airport
al-Jurjani
Gorgan-rud River
Gurganj

References

External links

Cities in Golestan Province
Hyrcania
Iranian provincial capitals